The 1953 European Judo Championships were the 3rd edition of the European Judo Championships, and were held at the Royal Albert Hall in London, England from 29 to 30 October 1953.

Medal winners

References 

European Judo Championships
European Judo Championships
European Judo Championships
Judo competitions in the United Kingdom
European Judo Championships
International sports competitions hosted by England
E